Royal Bahraini Army is the ground force component of the Bahrain Defence Force. The army's current strength is 15,000 personnel and headed by Lieutenant General Khalifa bin Abdullah Al-Khalifa.

History
Bahraini ground troops took part in the Saudi Arabian-led intervention in Yemen in the Yemeni civil war. In September 2015, five Bahraini soldiers guarding  Yemeni–Saudi Arabian border were killed in unspecified circumstances. Another three died in Yemen afterwards.

Formation
The army consists of 3 brigades and 2 battalions:

 1 Armoured Brigade
 2 armoured battalions
 1 recon battalion
 1 Mechanized Infantry Brigade
 2 mechanized infantry battalions
 1 infantry battalion
 1 Artillery Brigade
 6 artillery batteries
 1 air defence battalion
 1 special forces battalion

Equipment
RBA has a mix of equipment purchases in the 1970s and early 1990s. They are currently modernizing some of the army's equipment. Most purchases in the past have been second hand from the United States or Britain. In the past few years, Bahrain began developing military capabilities, through the purchase of many military equipment from Turkey, Bahrain has bought many Armoured vehicles from Turkey, such as Otokar Arma and Otokar Akrep (Armoured combat vehicle).

State Dept. clears $2.5 billion sale of Patriot missile defense system to Bahrain. 
The deal would include 60 Patriot Advanced Capability-3 Missile Segment Enhancement missiles, 36 Patriot MIM-104E Guidance Enhanced Missiles with canisters, nine M903 launchers, two AN/MPQ-65 radar sets, control stations and other associated equipment.

Armoured vehicles

Air Defense Systems

Artillery

Anti-tank Weapons

Weapons

Additional equipment on order by the army include:

Retired equipment were made in the 1950s and 1960s:

See also
 Military of Bahrain
 Royal Bahrain Naval Force
 Royal Bahraini Air Force

References

Sources
 Bahrain
 Bahrain Army Equipment

Military of Bahrain
Bahrain
Military units and formations established in 1977
Bahrain Defence Force
1977 establishments in Bahrain